Sowdeh, also rendered as Sowda, may refer to:
 Sowdeh-ye Olya
 Sowdeh-ye Sofla